Reverend Alfred Wheeler (27 October 1865 – 1949) was an Anglican minister and composer of spiritual and romantic music. He arranged children's folk songs and nursery rhymes for publication. He composed other songs and wrote orchestrations for larger choral works. Wheeler lived in Adelaide for eight years on arrival in Australia in 1899 before spending most of his life in Geelong. He was successful and well regarded as a musician and minister. He acted as director of the Australian performing rights organization.

Wheeler composed the score for a 1940 children's musical The Magic Basket with lyrics written by Melbourne university arts graduate Bronnie Taylor (Later Oxford PhD). The premiere played at Lauriston Girls School and was revived in New South Wales, Tasmania and South Australia and more recently in Queensland. The plot entails a magic basket used to recruit children to the moon, where they help the sand man rescue his sleep dust from goblins. Fourteen melodies and dialogue are preserved in Australian libraries.

Works
 1920: Soot and the Fairies : an amusing cantata suitable for schools
 1940: The Magic Basket: Children's Musical
 Old Mother Hubbard : a comic quartette for SATB
 1946: May Joy Be Yours
 1935: Love Triumphant 
 1937: An Old Fairy Tale
 Pompadour
 The Lord is my Light
 Spring Flowers (trio)
 Little Bo-Peep
 Song The Angels Sing
Ye Spotted Snakes (Lyrics William Shakespeare)
Minuet in G
The Bells (female part song)

Recordings
 2006 Love triumphant by Edward Larenson
 Humpty dumpty, Goosey goosey gander, Little Bo-peep
 Murmur of the bush

References

1865 births
1949 deaths
Australian male composers
Australian composers
Australian songwriters
Musicians from Geelong
Australian musical theatre composers